Arabic grammar or Arabic language sciences (  or  ) is the grammar of the Arabic language. Arabic is a Semitic language and its grammar has many similarities with the grammar of other Semitic languages. Classical Arabic and Modern Standard Arabic have largely the same grammar; colloquial spoken varieties of Arabic can vary in different ways.

The largest differences between classical and colloquial Arabic are the loss of morphological markings of grammatical case; changes in word order, an overall shift towards a more analytic morphosyntax, the loss of the previous system of grammatical mood, along with the evolution of a new system; the loss of the inflected passive voice, except in a few relict varieties; restriction in the use of the dual number and (for most varieties) the loss of the feminine plural. Many Arabic dialects, Maghrebi Arabic in particular, also have significant vowel shifts and unusual consonant clusters. Unlike in other dialects, first person singular verbs in Maghrebi Arabic begin with a n- (ن). This phenomenon can also be found in the Maltese language, which itself emerged from Sicilian Arabic.

History
The identity of the oldest Arabic grammarian is disputed; some sources state that it was Abu al-Aswad al-Du'ali, who established diacritical marks and vowels for Arabic in the mid-600s, Others have said that the earliest grammarian would have been Ibn Abi Ishaq (died AD 735/6, AH 117).

The schools of Basra and Kufa further developed grammatical rules in the late 8th century with the rapid rise of Islam, using Quran as the main source for Arabic grammar rules. From the school of Basra, generally regarded as being founded by Abu Amr ibn al-Ala, two representatives laid important foundations for the field: Al-Khalil ibn Ahmad al-Farahidi authored the first Arabic dictionary and book of Arabic prosody, and his student Sibawayh authored the first book on theories of Arabic grammar. From the school of Kufa, Al-Ru'asi is universally acknowledged as the founder, though his own writings are considered lost, with most of the school's development undertaken by later authors. The efforts of al-Farahidi and Sibawayh consolidated Basra's reputation as the analytic school of grammar, while the Kufan school was regarded as the guardian of Arabic poetry and Arab culture. The differences were polarizing in some cases, with early Muslim scholar Muhammad ibn `Isa at-Tirmidhi favoring the Kufan school due to its concern with poetry as a primary source.

Early Arabic grammars were more or less lists of rules, without the detailed explanations which would be added in later centuries. The earliest schools were different not only in some of their views on grammatical disputes, but also their emphasis. The school of Kufa excelled in Arabic poetry and exegesis of the Qur'an, in addition to Islamic law and Arab genealogy. The more rationalist school of Basra, on the other hand, focused more on the formal study of grammar.

Division
For classical Arabic grammarians, the grammatical sciences are divided into five branches:

  (language/lexicon) concerned with collecting and explaining vocabulary.
  (morphology) determining the form of the individual words.
  (syntax) primarily concerned with inflection.
  (derivation) examining the origin of the words.
  (rhetoric) which elucidates stylistic quality, or eloquence.

The grammar or grammars of contemporary varieties of Arabic are a different question. Said M. Badawi, an expert on Arabic grammar, divided Arabic grammar into five different types based on the speaker's level of literacy and the degree to which the speaker deviated from Classical Arabic. Badawi's five types of grammar from the most colloquial to the most formal are Illiterate Spoken Arabic, Semi-literate Spoken Arabic, Educated Spoken Arabic, Modern Standard Arabic, and Classical Arabic.

Phonology

Classical Arabic has 28 consonantal phonemes, including two semi-vowels, which constitute the Arabic alphabet.

It also has six vowel phonemes (three short vowels and three long vowels). These appear as various allophones, depending on the preceding consonant. Short vowels are not usually represented in the written language, although they may be indicated with diacritics.

Word stress varies from one Arabic dialect to another. A rough rule for word-stress in Classical Arabic is that it falls on the penultimate syllable of a word if that syllable is closed, and otherwise on the antepenultimate.

, elidable hamza, is a phonetic object prefixed to the beginning of a word for ease of pronunciation, since Literary Arabic doesn't allow consonant clusters at the beginning of a word. Elidable hamza drops out as a vowel, if a word is preceding it. This word will then produce an ending vowel, "helping vowel" to facilitate pronunciation. The symbol  indicates gemination or consonant doubling. See more in Tashkīl.

Nouns and adjectives

In Classical Arabic and Modern Standard Arabic (MSA), nouns and adjectives are declined, according to case, state (definiteness), gender and number. In colloquial or spoken Arabic, there are a number of simplifications such as the loss of certain final vowels and the loss of case. A number of derivational processes exist for forming new nouns and adjectives. Adverbs can be formed from adjectives.

Pronouns

Personal pronouns 
In Arabic, personal pronouns have 12 forms. In singular and plural, the 2nd and 3rd persons have separate masculine and feminine forms, while the 1st person does not. In the dual, there is no 1st person, and only a single form for each 2nd and 3rd person. Traditionally, the pronouns are listed in the order 3rd, 2nd, 1st.

Enclitic pronouns 
The enclitic forms of personal pronouns are used both as accusative and genitive forms of the pronouns. As genitive forms they appear in the following contexts:

 After the construct state of nouns, where they have the meaning of possessive determiners, e.g. "my, your, his"
 After prepositions, where they have the meaning of objects of the prepositions, e.g. "to me, to you, to him"

As accusative forms they appear:

 Attached to verbs, where they have the meaning of direct object pronouns, e.g. "me, you, him"
 Attached to conjunctions and particles like   "that ...",   "because ...",   "but ...",   (topicalizing particle), where they have the meaning of subject pronouns, e.g. "because I ...", "because you ...", "because he ...".

Only the first person singular makes a distinction between the genitive and accusative function. As a possessive it takes the form -ī while as an object form it has the form -nī (e.g. (  "you saw me").

Most of the enclitic forms are clearly related to the full personal pronouns.

Variant forms 
For all but the first person singular, the same forms are used regardless of the part of speech of the word attached to. The same alternation occurs in the third person dual and plural.

In the first person singular, however, the situation is more complicated. Specifically,  "me" is attached to verbs, but  "my" is attached to nouns. In the latter case,  is attached to nouns whose construct state ends in a long vowel or diphthong (e.g. in the sound masculine plural and the dual), while  is attached to nouns whose construct state ends in a short vowel, in which case that vowel is elided (e.g. in the sound feminine plural, as well as the singular and broken plural of most nouns). Furthermore,  of the masculine sound plural is assimilated to  before  (presumably,  of masculine defective -an plurals is similarly assimilated to ). Examples:
 From   "book", pl   (most of nouns in general).

 From   "world";   "hospital" (nouns ending on ).

 From nom. dual   "teachers", acc./gen. dual   (dual nouns)

 From nom. pl.   "teachers", acc./gen. pl.   (regular plural  nouns)

 From pl.   "chosen" (regular plural  nouns)

 From   "father", long construct form   (long construct nouns)

Prepositions use , even though in this case it has the meaning of "me" (rather than "my"). The "sisters of " can use either form (e.g.   or  ), but the longer form (e.g.  ) is usually preferred.

The second-person masculine plural past tense verb ending  changes to the variant form  before enclitic pronouns, e.g.   "you (masc. pl.) wrote it (masc.)".

Pronouns with prepositions 
Some very common prepositions — including the proclitic preposition  "to" (also used for indirect objects) — have irregular or unpredictable combining forms when the enclitic pronouns are added to them:

In the above cases, when there are two combining forms, one is used with "... me" and the other with all other person/number/gender combinations. (More correctly, one occurs before vowel-initial pronouns and the other before consonant-initial pronouns, but in Classical Arabic, only  is vowel-initial. This becomes clearer in the spoken varieties, where various vowel-initial enclitic pronouns exist.)

Note in particular:
   "to" and   "on" have irregular combining forms  ,  ; but other pronouns with the same base form are regular, e.g.   "with".
   "to" has an irregular combining form , but   "in, with, by" is regular.
   "from" and   "on" double the final n before .

Less formal pronominal forms 
In a less formal Arabic, as in many spoken dialects, the endings -ka, -ki, and -hu and many others have their final short vowel dropped, for example, كِتابُكَ kitābuka would become كِتابُك kitābuk for ease of pronunciation. This doesn't make a difference to the spelling as the diacritics used to represent short vowels are not usually written.

Demonstratives
There are two demonstratives, near-deictic ('this') and far-deictic ('that'):

The dual forms are only used in very formal Arabic.

Some of the demonstratives (and ) should be pronounced with a long , although the unvocalised script is not written with alif. Instead of an alif, they have the diacritic , which doesn't exist on Arabic keyboards and is seldom written, even in vocalised Arabic.

Qur'anic Arabic has another demonstrative, normally followed by a noun in a genitive construct and meaning 'owner of':

Note that the demonstrative and relative pronouns were originally built on this word. These combinations had not yet become completely fixed in Qur'anic Arabic and other combinations sometimes occurred, e.g. , . Similarly, the relative pronoun  was originally composed based on the genitive singular , and the old Arabic grammarians noted the existence of a separate nominative plural form  in the speech of the Hudhayl tribe in Qur'anic times.

This word also shows up in Hebrew, e.g. masculine  zeh (cf. ), feminine  zot (cf. ), plural  eleh (cf. ).

Relative pronoun
The relative pronoun is declined as follows:

Note that the relative pronoun agrees in gender, number and case, with the noun it modifies—as opposed to the situation in other inflected languages such as Latin and German, where the gender and number agreement is with the modified noun, but the case marking follows the usage of the relative pronoun in the embedded clause (as in formal English "the man who saw me" vs. "the man whom I saw").

When the relative pronoun serves a function other than the subject of the embedded clause, a resumptive pronoun is required:  , literally "the man who I spoke with him".

The relative pronoun is normally omitted entirely when an indefinite noun is modified by a relative clause:   "a man that I spoke with", literally "a man I spoke with him".

Colloquial varieties
The above system is mostly unchanged in the colloquial varieties, other than the loss of the dual forms and (for most varieties) of the feminine plural. Some of the more notable changes:
The third-person  variants disappear. On the other hand, the first person  variation is preserved exactly (including the different circumstances in which these variants are used), and new variants appear for many forms.
In many varieties, the indirect object forms, which appear in Classical Arabic as separate words (e.g.  "to me",  'to him'), become fused onto the verb, following a direct object. These same varieties generally develop a circumfix  for negation (from Classical  'not ... a thing', composed of two separate words). This can lead to complicated agglutinative constructs, such as Egyptian Arabic  'he didn't write it (fem.) to me'. (Egyptian Arabic in particular has many variant pronominal affixes used in different circumstances, and very intricate morphophonemic rules leading to a large number of complex alternations, depending on the particular affixes involved, the way they are put together, and whether the preceding verb ends in a vowel, a single consonant, or two consonants.)
Other varieties instead use a separate Classical pseudo-pronoun  for direct objects (but in Hijazi Arabic the resulting construct fuses with a preceding verb).
Affixation of dual and sound plural nouns has largely vanished. Instead, all varieties possess a separate preposition with the meaning of "of", which replaces certain uses of the construct genitive (to varying degrees, depending on the particular variety). In Moroccan Arabic, the word is dyal (also d- before a noun), e.g. l-kitab dyal-i "my book", since the construct-state genitive is mostly unproductive. Egyptian Arabic has bitā‘ , which agrees in gender and number with the preceding noun (feminine bitā‘it/bita‘t, plural bitū‘ ). In Egyptian Arabic, the construct-state genitive is still productive, hence either kitāb-i or il-kitāb bitā‘-i can be used for "my book" [the difference between them is similar to the difference between 'my book' and 'the book is mine'], but only il-mu‘allimūn bitū‘-i "my teachers".
The declined relative pronoun has vanished. In its place is an indeclinable particle, usually illi or similar.
Various forms of the demonstrative pronouns occur, usually shorter than the Classical forms. For example, Moroccan Arabic uses ha l- "this", dak l-/dik l-/duk l- "that" (masculine/feminine/plural). Egyptian Arabic is unusual in that the demonstrative follows the noun, e.g. il-kitāb da "this book", il-binti di "this girl".
Some of the independent pronouns have slightly different forms compared with their Classical forms.

Numerals

Cardinal numerals 
Numbers behave in a very complicated fashion.  "one" and  "two" are adjectives, following the noun and agreeing with it.  "three" through  "ten" require a following noun in the genitive plural, but disagree with the noun in gender, while taking the case required by the surrounding syntax.  "eleven" through  "nineteen" require a following noun in the accusative singular, agree with the noun in gender, and are invariable for case, except for  "twelve".

The formal system of cardinal numerals, as used in Classical Arabic, is extremely complex. The system of rules is presented below. In reality, however, this system is never used: Large numbers are always written as numerals rather than spelled out, and are pronounced using a simplified system, even in formal contexts.

Example:
 Formal:   "2,912 years"
 Spoken:   "2,912 years"
 Formal:   "after 2,912 years"
 Spoken:   "after 2,912 years"

Cardinal numerals from 0–10. Zero is ṣifr, from which the words "cipher" and "zero" are ultimately derived.
 0  
 1  
 2  
 3  
 4  
 5  
 6  
 7  
 8  
 9  
 10   (feminine form  )

It is very common, even by news announcers and in official speeches, to pronounce numerals in local dialects.

The endings in brackets are dropped in less formal Arabic and in pausa.  is pronounced as simple  in these cases.

This form is also commonly used in a less formal Arabic in the nominative case.

The numerals 1 and 2 are adjectives. Thus they follow the noun and agree with gender.

Numerals 3–10 have a peculiar rule of agreement known as polarity: A feminine referrer agrees with a numeral in masculine gender and vice versa, e.g.  "three girls". The noun counted takes indefinite genitive plural (as the attribute in a genitive construct).

Numerals 11 and 13–19 are indeclinable for case, perpetually in the accusative. Numbers 11 and 12 show gender agreement in the ones, and 13–19 show polarity in the ones. Number 12 also shows case agreement, reminiscent of the dual. The counted noun takes indefinite accusative singular.

Unitary numbers from 20 on (i.e. 20, 30, ... 90, 100, 1000, 1000000, etc.) behave entirely as nouns, showing the case required by the surrounding syntax, no gender agreement, and a following noun in a fixed case. 20 through 90 require their noun to be in the accusative singular; 100 and up require the genitive singular. The unitary numbers themselves decline in various fashions:
  "20" through  "90" decline as masculine plural nouns
  "100" ( or ) declines as a feminine singular noun
  "1,000" declines as a masculine singular noun

The numbers 20–99 are expressed with the units preceding the tens. There is agreement in gender with the numerals 1 and 2, and polarity for numerals 3–9. The whole construct is followed by the accusative singular indefinite.
 20  (plural of 10)
 21 
 22 
 23 
 30 
 40 

 "100" and  "1,000" can themselves be modified by numbers (to form numbers such as 200 or 5,000) and will be declined appropriately.

In compound numbers, the number formed with the last two digits dictates the declension of the associated noun, e.g. 212, 312, and 54,312 would all behave like 12.

Large compound numbers can have, e.g.:

   "1,909 years"
   "after 1,909 years"
   "94,863 years"
   "after 94,863 years"
   "12,222 years"
   "after 12,222 years"
   "12,202 years"
   "after 12,202 years"

Note also the special construction when the final number is 1 or 2:
  "1,001 nights"
  "102 books"

Fractions
Fractions of a whole smaller than "half" are expressed by the structure  in the singular,  in the plural.
 half 
 one-third 
 two-thirds 
 one-quarter 
 three-quarters 
 etc.

Ordinal numerals
m.  , f.   "first"
m.  , f.   "second"
m.  , f.   "third"
m.  , f.   "fourth"
m.  , f.   "fifth"
m.  , f.   "sixth"
m.  , f.   "seventh"
m.  , f.   "eighth"
m.  , f.   "ninth"
m.  , f.   "tenth"

They are adjectives, hence there is agreement in gender with the noun, not polarity as with the cardinal numbers. Note that "sixth" uses a different, older root than the number six.

Verbs

Arabic verbs ( fi‘l), like the verbs in other Semitic languages, are extremely complex. Verbs in Arabic are based on a root made up of three or four consonants (called a triliteral or quadriliteral root, respectively). The set of consonants communicates the basic meaning of a verb, e.g. k-t-b 'write', q-r-’ 'read', ’-k-l 'eat'. Changes to the vowels in between the consonants, along with prefixes or suffixes, specify grammatical functions such as tense, person and number, in addition to changes in the meaning of the verb that embody grammatical concepts such as mood (e.g. indicative, subjunctive, imperative), voice (active or passive), and functions such as causative, intensive, or reflexive.

Since Arabic lacks an auxiliary verb "to have", constructions using li-, ‘inda, and ma‘a with the pronominal suffixes are used to describe possession. For example:  (ʿindahu bayt) – literally: At him (is) a house. → He has a house.

For the negation of Arabic verbs, see Negation in Arabic.

Prepositions

There are two types of prepositions, based on whether they arise from the triconsonantal roots system or not. The 'true prepositions' do not stem from the triconsonantal roots. These true prepositions cannot have prepositions preceding them, in contrast to the derived triliteral prepositions. True prepositions can also be used with certain verbs to convey a particular meaning.

The prepositions arising from the triliteral root system are called "adverbs of place and time" in the native tradition and work very much in the same way as the 'true' prepositions.

A noun following a preposition takes the genitive case.

Syntax

Genitive construction 

A noun may be defined more precisely by adding another noun immediately afterwards. In Arabic grammar, this is called   ("annexation, addition") and in English is known as the "genitive construct", "construct phrase", or "annexation structure". The first noun must be in the construct form while, when cases are used, the subsequent noun must be in the genitive case. The construction is typically equivalent to the English construction "(noun) of (noun)". This is a very widespread way of forming possessive constructions in Arabic, and is typical of a Semitic language.

Simple examples include:
   "the daughter of Hasan/Hasan's daughter".
   "the house of peace".
   "a kilo of bananas".
   "the house of a man/a man's house".
   "the house of the man/the man's house".

The range of relationships between the first and second elements of the idafah construction is very varied, though it usually consists of some relationship of possession or belonging. In the case of words for containers, the idāfah may express what is contained:   "a cup of coffee". The idāfah may indicate the material something is made of:   "a wooden ring, ring made of wood". In many cases the two members become a fixed coined phrase, the idafah being used as the equivalent of a compound noun used in some Indo-European languages such as English. Thus   can mean "house of the (certain, known) students", but is also the normal term for "the student hostel".

Word order

Word order in classical Arabic

Classical Arabic tends to prefer the word order VSO (verb before subject before object), but uses the particle ʼinna and SVO (subject before verb) to emphasize the subject. Verb-initial word orders like in Classical Arabic are relatively rare across the world's languages, occurring only in a few language families including Celtic, Austronesian, and Mayan. The different Arabic word orders have an agreement asymmetry: the verb shows person, number, and gender agreement with the subject in SVO constructions but only gender (and possibly person) agreement in VSO, to the exclusion of number.

Modern Standard Arabic tends to use SVO without ʼinna.

{|
|+ Full agreement: SVO order
|-
| 
|-
| 
|}

{|
|+ Partial agreement: VSO order
|-
| 
|-
| 
|}

Despite the fact that the subject in the latter two above examples is plural, the verb lacks plural marking and instead surfaces as if it was in the singular form.

Though early accounts of Arabic word order variation argued for a flat, non-configurational grammatical structure, more recent work has shown that there is evidence for a VP constituent in Arabic, that is, a closer relationship between verb and object than verb and subject. This suggests a hierarchical grammatical structure, not a flat one. An analysis such as this one can also explain the agreement asymmetries between subjects and verbs in SVO versus VSO sentences, and can provide insight into the syntactic position of pre- and post-verbal subjects, as well as the surface syntactic position of the verb.

In the present tense, there is no overt copula in Arabic. In such clauses, the subject tends to precede the predicate, unless there is a clear demarcating pause between the two, suggesting a marked information structure. It is a matter of debate in Arabic literature whether there is a null present tense copula which syntactically precedes the subject in verbless sentences, or whether there is simply no verb, only a subject and predicate.

Subject pronouns are normally omitted except for emphasis or when using a participle as a verb (participles are not marked for person). Because the verb agrees with the subject in person, number, and gender, no information is lost when pronouns are omitted. Auxiliary verbs precede main verbs, prepositions precede their objects, and nouns precede their relative clauses.

Adjectives follow the noun they are modifying, and agree with the noun in case, gender, number, and state: For example,   'a beautiful girl' but   'the beautiful girl'. (Compare   'the girl is beautiful'.) Elative adjectives, however, usually don't agree with the noun they modify, and sometimes even precede their noun while requiring it to be in the genitive case.

Word order in colloquial spoken Arabic
Colloquial spoken Arabic may employ different word order than Classical Arabic or Modern Standard Arabic.

Regarding subject-verb order, Owens et al. (2009), examined three dialects of the Arabian peninsula from a discourse informational and a morpholexical perspective. They show that subject-verb or verb-subject word order is correlated with the lexical class (i.e. pronoun, pronominal, noun), definiteness, and the discourse-defined lexical specificity of a noun. Owens et al. (2009) argue that verb-subject order usually presents events, while subject-verb indicates available referentiality.

In Modern Standard Arabic, the VSO and SVO word orders results in an agreement asymmetry between the verb and the subject: the verb shows person, number, and gender agreement with the subject in SVO constructions, but only gender (and possibly person) agreement in VS, to the exclusion of number. In Lebanese Arabic and Moroccan Arabic, there is agreement between verb and subject in number under both the SV and the VS orders.

El-Yasin (1985) examined colloquial Jordanian Arabic, and concluded that it exhibits a SVO order. This, according to El-Yasin, provides evidence of a language changing from a VSO (CA) into a SVO language (Jordanian Arabic). On the other hand, Mohammad, M. A. (2000) showed that MSA allows all six possible word orders (VSO, SVO, VOS, SOV, OSV, OVS) while Palastinian Arabic (PA) allows only three word orders, namely: VSO, VOS, and SVO.

In her book Spoken Arabic, Brustad, K. (2000) notes that in the dialects she studied (Moroccan, Egyptian, Syrian, and Kuwaiti) verb initial (VSO) and subject initial (SVO) word orders are present. In the case of verb initial word order, it is common that the subject is marked on the verb and is not expressed as an independent verb.

Brustad, K. (2000) points out that if both VSO and SVO are basic typologies in spoken Arabic, then functional typology investigating the semantic and pragmatic roles can shed light on the different contexts where these word orders appear. Despite the analysis that both VS and SV typologies are found in spoken Arabic dialects (Moroccan, Egyptian, Syrian, and Kuwaiti), Brustad, K. (2000) notes that sentence typologies found in spoken Arabic are not limited to these two word orders. She adds that almost any basic constituent may begin an Arabic sentence. She argues that sentences other than VS and SV are marked forms of topic-prominent or subject-prominent sentences.

’inna
The subject of a sentence can be topicalized and emphasized by moving it to the beginning of the sentence and preceding it with the word   'indeed' (or 'verily' in older translations). An example would be   'The sky is blue indeed'.

, along with its related terms (or   "sister" terms in the native tradition)   'that' (as in "I think that ..."),  'that' (after   'say'),   'but' and   'as if' introduce subjects while requiring that they be immediately followed by a noun in the accusative case, or an attached pronominal suffix.

Definite article 

As a particle, al- does not inflect for gender, number, person, or grammatical case. The sound of the final -l consonant, however, can vary; when followed by a sun letter such as t, d, r, s, n and a few others, it is replaced by the sound of the initial consonant of the following noun, thus doubling it. For example: for "the Nile", one does not say al-Nīl, but an-Nīl. When followed by a moon letter, like m-, no replacement occurs, as in al-masjid ("the mosque"). This affects only the pronunciation and not the spelling of the article.

Absolute object (al-maf'ūl al-muṭlaq) 
The absolute object is an emphatic cognate object construction in which a verbal noun derived from the main verb appears in the accusative case.

Object of purpose (al-maf'ūl li-'ajlihi) 
The  is an adverbial structure used to indicate purpose, motive, or reason for an action. It consists of a verbal noun derived from the main verb that appears in the accusative case.

Dynasty or family 

Other
Object pronouns are clitics and are attached to the verb; e.g.,   'I see her'. Possessive pronouns are likewise attached to the noun they modify; e.g.,   'his book'. The definite article   is a clitic, as are the prepositions   'to' and   'in, with' and the conjunctions   'as' and   'then, so'.

Reform of the Arabic tradition
An overhaul of the native systematic categorization of Arabic grammar was first suggested by the medieval philosopher al-Jāḥiẓ, though it was not until two hundred years later when Ibn Maḍāʾ wrote his Refutation of the Grammarians that concrete suggestions regarding word order and linguistic governance were made. In the modern era, Egyptian litterateur Shawqi Daif renewed the call for a reform of the commonly used description of Arabic grammar, suggesting to follow trends in Western linguistics instead.

See also
Arabic language
List of Arabic dictionaries
I‘rab
Literary Arabic
Varieties of Arabic
Arabic alphabet
Quranic Arabic Corpus
Romanization of Arabic
Wiktionary: appendix on Arabic verbs
WikiBook: Learn Arabic
Sibawayh
Ibn Adjurrum
Ajārūmīya
Ibn Malik
Alfiya
Semitic root

Notes

References

External links

Arabic conjugation 24000 Verbs
Wright's Arabic Grammar
 Arabic Grammar: Paradigms, Literature, Exercises and Glossary By Albert Socin
A Practical Arabic Grammar, Part 1
Einleitung in das studium der arabischen grammatiker: Die Ajrūmiyyah des Muh'ammad bin Daūd By Muḥammad ibn Muḥammad Ibn Ājurrūm
Alexis Neme and Eric Laporte (2013) Pattern-and-root inflectional morphology: the Arabic broken plural |year=2013
 Alexis Neme (2011), A lexicon of Arabic verbs constructed on the basis of Semitic taxonomy and using finite-state transducers
Alexis Neme and Eric Laporte (2015), Do computer scientists deeply understand Arabic morphology? – , available also in Arabic, Indonesian, French